Andrew Gee may refer to:

 Andrew Gee (rugby league) (born 1970), Australian rugby league administrator
 Andrew Gee (politician) (born 1968), Australian politician

See also
 Osher Günsberg, Australian television personality formerly known as Andrew G